Greenwich is a civil parish in Kings County, New Brunswick, Canada.

The local service district is a member of the Fundy Regional Service Commission (FRSC).

Origin of name
The origin of the parish's name is uncertain, Greenwich being a placename in several of the Thirteen Colonies. Historian William F. Ganong listed Greenwich, England as a possible source, then later added Greenwich Village in New York and Greenwich Street in Hempstead, New York.

Notable is that the names of Kings County's pre-1800 parishes all occur in both New Jersey and North Carolina.

History
Greenwich was erected in 1795 from Kingston Parish.

In 1860 the mainland east of the Saint John River was included in the newly erected parish of Kars.

Boundaries
Greenwich Parish is bounded:

on the northwest by the Queens County line;
on the northeast by the Saint John River;
on the southeast by the Long Reach of the Saint John River;
on the southwest by a line beginning at the mouth of Devils Back Brook where the southwestern line of the grant to George Young strikes, then northwesterly along the grant line and its prolongation to the county line at a point about 300 metres northeasterly of the northern end of Mud Lake;
including Catons Island, Grassy Island, Isle of Pines, Rocky Island, and Rush Island in Long Reach.

Governance
The entire parish forms the local service district of the parish of Greenwich, established in 1976 to assess for fire protection and first aid and ambulance services. Recreational facilities were added to the assessment in 1995, with first aid and ambulance services removed at the same time.

Communities
Communities at least partly within the parish; italics indicate a name no longer in official use

Browns Corner
Browns Flat
Central Greenwich
Cochrane Corner
Days Corner
Evandale
Glenwood
Grand View
Greenwich Hill
Johnson Croft
Lynch Corner
McPherson
Oak Point
Upper Greenwich
Victoria Beach

Bodies of water
Bodies of water at least partly in the parish:
Saint John River
Jones Creek
Marley Creek
Nutter Creek
more than fifteen officially named lakes

Islands
Islands at least partly in the parish.
Catons Island
Grassy Island
Isle of Pines
Rocky Island
Rush Island

Demographics

Population
Population trend

Language
Mother tongue (2016)

Access Routes
Highways and numbered routes that run through the parish, including external routes that start or finish at the parish limits:

Highways
None

Principal Routes

None

External Routes:
None

See also
List of parishes in New Brunswick

Notes

References

Parishes of Kings County, New Brunswick
Local service districts of Kings County, New Brunswick